Jawahar Navodaya Vidyalaya, Durgapur or locally called as JNV Durgapur is a boarding, co-educational  school in Paschim Bardhaman district of West Bengal in India. Navodaya Vidyalayas are funded by the Indian Ministry of Human Resources Development and administered  by Navodaya Vidyalaya Smiti, an autonomous body under the ministry.

History 
The school was founded in 2003 and is a part of Jawahar Navodaya Vidyalaya schools. This school is administered and monitored by Patna regional office of Navodaya Vidyalaya Smiti. When established, this school was part of Burdwan district. On 7 April 2017 erstwhile Bardhaman district was bifurcated and JNV Durgapur is part of Paschim Bardhaman district since then.

Affiliations 
JNV Durgapur is affiliated to Central Board of Secondary Education with affiliation number 2440002.

See also 

 List of JNV schools

References

External links 

 Official Website of JNV Paschim Bardhaman

Boarding schools in West Bengal
High schools and secondary schools in West Bengal
Paschim Bardhaman district
Schools in Paschim Bardhaman district
Educational institutions established in 2003
2003 establishments in West Bengal